Wattala is a large suburb of Colombo city, in Western Province, Sri Lanka, situated around 9 km from Colombo city centre. This suburb is situated on A3 highway from Colombo to Negombo. Around Wattala, there are many villages and towns.

People from all walks of life live in this area. The traditional fisher folk, large sections of the working class, many types of white collar workers, a fair number of professionals and even some richer folk live here. Churches, Buddhist temples, Hindu temples, mosques, schools of various grades and many private dispensaries are spread throughout the area. Though it is a majority Roman Catholic area, people of many faiths live here in peaceful coexistence. A sizable population also exists of minority Tamils and a smaller percentage of Muslims. There has been no record of any violence used by one faith group or racial group against another.

This area also produces many migrant workers. Almost all families produce one or more persons who go abroad for employment. The migrant workers also bring back income and therefore have an influence in creating new trends in the society.

Wattala has become a popular area for living and buying property and has recently become the 3rd most popular city for house searches, according to property website LankaPropertyWeb.com

Schools

St. Joseph's College, Wattala
 St. Mary's maha Vidyalaya uswetakeiyawe
 St. Anthony’s college wattala
 Karunarathna Buddhist National College, Wattala
 Lyceum International School - Alwis Town Rd - Wattala
 St. Anne's Balika Maha Vidyalaya, Wattala
St. Sebastian's Maha Vidyalaya, Enderamulla
 St. Mary's Vidyalaya
 O.K.I. International School
 Vidyaloka Maha Vidyalaya
 Shri Sidhdhaartha Maha Vidyalaya
 Al Ashraff Maha Vidyalaya
 Zahira Maha Vidyalaya - Hunupitiya
 Arch Bishop's Boys College
 York International School Wattala
 Roman Catholic Primary School
 Good Shepherd Balika Maha Vidyalaya - Nayakakanda
 Vidyaloka Vidyalaya - Kerawalapitiya
 Nayakakanda Balika Primary School
 Rahula Kanishta Viduhala
 Shasthraloka Kanishta Viduhala
 Roman Catholic Tamil Vidyalayam
 Sri Rathnapala Maha Vidyalaya
 Chrishthuraja Vidyalaya
 Bandaranayake Maha Viduhala
 U.N.H. International School
 Paalam International School
 Salford International School
 Trust International School
 Arun Manikavasagam Vivekananda College 
 Lyceum international school

Hospital
 Hemas Hospitals
 Lions Sight First Hospital

Supermarkets

 Arpico Super Center
 Keells Super
 Cargills Food City
 Laughs Supermarket
 SPAR

Restaurants/Coffee Shops

 KFC
 Burger King
 Pizza Hut
 McDonald's - Welisara
 The Fab
 Rococo Cake Bakers
 Bread Talk
 Dinemore
 Dominos
 St. Anthony's Foods
 Savannah Restaurant
 Pan
 Al Maas
 Aroma
 Shifana Hotel

Shopping facilities
 Saaniyaa Saree Centre
 Odel
 Fashion Bug
 Kandy
 Nolimit
 Cool Planet
 Spring & Summer
 Gani Fashion
 Hameedias
Ranjanaa Textiles

References 

Populated places in Western Province, Sri Lanka
Suburbs of Colombo